
Year 151 BC was a year of the pre-Julian Roman calendar. At the time it was known as the Year of the Consulship of Lucullus and Albinus (or, less frequently, year 603 Ab urbe condita). The denomination 151 BC for this year has been used since the early medieval period, when the Anno Domini calendar era became the prevalent method in Europe for naming years.

Events 
 By place 

 Carthage 
 The Carthaginian debt to Rome is fully repaid, meaning that, according to Carthage, the treaty with Rome, which was put in place at the end of the Second Punic War, is no longer in force. The Romans do not agree with this interpretation. Instead they view the treaty as a permanent declaration of Carthaginian subordination to Rome.
 Numidia launches another border raid on Carthaginian soil, besieging a town. In response Carthage launches a large military expedition (25,000 soldiers) to repel the Numidian invaders.

 Roman Republic 
 At Polybius' request, Scipio Aemilianus manages to gain the support of the Roman statesman Cato the Elder (whose son has married Scipio's sister Aemilia) for a proposal to release (and return to Greece) the 300 Achaean internees who are still being held without trial after being deported to Rome in 167 BC.
 Roman forces help the thriving Greek commercial port of Massilia combat raids from the Celts from Cisalpine Gaul.
 Roman armies under the leadership of praetor Servius Sulpicius Galba and the proconsul Lucius Licinius Lucullus arrive in Hispania Ulterior and begin the process of subduing the local population. The revolt of the Celtiberians of Numantia is stopped.

 India 
 Agnimitra succeeds his father Pushyamitra Shunga as emperor of the Shunga dynasty.

Deaths 
 Pushyamitra Shunga, Indian emperor and founder of the Indian Shunga dynasty, who has reigned since 185 BC

References